Federico Ricci (born 27 May 1994) is an Italian professional footballer who plays as a winger for  club Reggina. He is the twin brother of fellow footballer Matteo Ricci.

Club career

Roma
Ricci is a product of Roma youth academy. He was promoted to the first squad for the 2013–14 season. He made his Serie A debut on 1 December 2013, coming off the bench and helping the team come back from down 1–0 to draw away at Atalanta. Ricci made his first start for Roma in the 1–0 defeat against Genoa on 18 May 2014. Ricci played four games for Roma during the season.

Crotone (loan)
In July 2014, Ricci signed for Serie B side Crotone on loan until the end of the 2014–15 season. Ricci made his debut in the 3–4 penalties Coppa Italia defeat to Casertana on 17 August 2014, after the match finished 0–0. On 9 July 2015, the loan was extended. During the 2015–16 season, Ricci scored 11 league goals, helping Crotone gain promotion to the Serie A for the first time in their history.

Sassuolo (loan)
On 31 August 2016, Ricci was signed by Serie A club Sassuolo, on a temporary deal for €500,000, with an option to buy. He made his European debut for Sassuolo in UEFA Europa League, playing all six group stage matches.

Sassuolo
On 30 June 2017, Ricci was signed by Sassuolo outright for €3 million fee. On the same day another Roma youth product Lorenzo Pellegrini was bought back by Roma from Sassuolo, for €10 million fee.

Genoa (loan)
On 31 August 2017, Ricci joined Genoa on a season-long loan from Sassuolo, with an option to buy.

Crotone (loan)
In January 2018, Ricci returned to Serie A side Crotone on loan until the end of the 2017–18 season.

Benevento (loan)
On 2 August 2018, Ricci joined Serie B side Benevento on loan until 30 June 2019.

Spezia (loan)
On 15 July 2019, he joined Serie B club Spezia on loan. Ricci played 29 games in all competitions, scoring four goals – he helped Spezia gain promotion to the Serie A for the first time in their history.

Monza (loan)
On 12 January 2020, Ricci moved to Serie B club Monza on a six-month loan. He made his debut on 31 January, as a substitute against SPAL in a 1–1 league draw.

Reggina
On 13 July 2021, he signed a three-year contract with Reggina.

Ascoli (loan)
On 31 January 2022, Ricci was loaned to Ascoli with an option to buy.

International career
On 24 March 2016, Ricci made his debut with Italy's U21 team, in a 4–1 victory against Ireland.

Career statistics

Club

References

External links
 
 Under-21 stats at FIGC

1994 births
Living people
Association football wingers
Italian footballers
Serie A players
Serie B players
A.S. Roma players
F.C. Crotone players
U.S. Sassuolo Calcio players
Genoa C.F.C. players
Benevento Calcio players
Spezia Calcio players
A.C. Monza players
Reggina 1914 players
Ascoli Calcio 1898 F.C. players
Italy under-21 international footballers
Italy youth international footballers